Aarani Satyanarayana or Arani Satyanarayana (11 November 1898 – 2 July 1969) was a Telugu film and drama actor during the early period of Telugu cinema.

He was born in Sangadi Gunta village in Guntur district in 1898. He acted in Gayopakhyanam drama as Satyabhama at the age of 14 in 1912.

He entered the cinema industry during the silent era, where he was introduced by R. S. Prakash in 1921. He later acted in Ramadasu (1933) of Ghantasala Balaramayya. He got a good name for portraying the role of Vidura in Draupadi Vastrapaharanam (1936) from Saraswati Talkies. He acted in Kanakatara, Balayogini, Dharmangada, Ratnamala, and Laila Majnu and played various roles.

He joined Vinoda Pictures as an accountant and acted in their Devadasu and Shanti films.

Filmography
 Ramadasu (1933) .... Thanisha
 Balayogini (1936/I)
 Draupadi Vastrapaharanam (1936)  ...   Vidura
 Kanakatara (1937)
 Chandika (1940)
 Ratnamala (1947)
 Dharmangada (1949)
 Laila Majnu (1949)
 Shanti (1952)
 Devadasu (1953) .... Dharmanna

References

External links
 Satyanarayana Aarani page at IMDb.
 Arani Satyanarayana page at IMDb.
 1933 telugu movie.

1898 births
1969 deaths
Telugu male actors
Indian male stage actors
20th-century Indian male actors